Sydhavn is a station on the Køge radial of the S-train network in Copenhagen, Denmark. The station is named after Sydhavnen (South Harbour), a district of southern Copenhagen.

Railway stations opened in 1972
1972 establishments in Denmark
S-train (Copenhagen) stations
Kongens Enghave
Railway stations in Denmark opened in the 20th century